Zhongshan railway station is an elevated station of Guangzhou–Zhuhai intercity railway.

The station is located at Simen Village, Zhongshan Torch Hi-tech Industrial Development Zone, Zhongshan, Guangdong, China. It started operations on 7 January 2011.

References

Railway stations in Guangdong
Zhongshan
Railway stations in China opened in 2011